Kjersti Østgaard Buaas (born 5 January 1982) is a Norwegian snowboarder from Trondheim. She placed 4th in women's half-pipe at the 2002 Winter Olympics in Salt Lake City, United States. She received a bronze medal at the 2006 Winter Olympics in women's half-pipe in Turin, Italy. Buaas recovered from a broken leg only a week before her bronze-winning ride.

In 2007/2008 she finished World No.3 on the Swatch TTR World Snowboard Tour (Ticket to Ride (World Snowboard Tour))

Competition Results
Swatch TTR 2008/2009 Season
3rd – Slopestyle – 6Star Burton European Open (Ticket to Ride (World Snowboard Tour))
2nd – Halfpipe – 6Star Burton European Open (Ticket to Ride (World Snowboard Tour))
4th – Halfpipe – 6Star Burton US Open (Ticket to Ride (World Snowboard Tour))
1st – Slopestyle – 6Star Burton US Open (Ticket to Ride (World Snowboard Tour))

References

External links
 
 
 
 

1982 births
Living people
Norwegian female snowboarders
Snowboarders at the 2002 Winter Olympics
Snowboarders at the 2006 Winter Olympics
Snowboarders at the 2010 Winter Olympics
Snowboarders at the 2014 Winter Olympics
Olympic snowboarders of Norway
Olympic bronze medalists for Norway
Sportspeople from Trondheim
Olympic medalists in snowboarding
Medalists at the 2006 Winter Olympics
X Games athletes
21st-century Norwegian women